Hoplodrina respersa, the sprinkled rustic, is a moth of the family Noctuidae. It is known from southern and central Europe, the southern part of European Russia, Asia Minor, Turkey and Transcaucasus.

The length of the forewing is 1.4 cm. The ground colour is pale and there are rows of black dots on the forewings. The hindwings are relatively dark, as in Hoplodrina octogenaria.

Adults are on wing from May to August.

The larvae feed on various herbaceous plants.

References

External links

Lepiforum.de
Vlindernet.nl 

Caradrinini
Moths of Europe
Moths of Asia
Moths described in 1775
Taxa named by Michael Denis
Taxa named by Ignaz Schiffermüller